Pilots Demobilized (Les Aviateurs Démobilisés) is the third story arc in the Franco-Belgian Buck Danny comic book series, by Jean-Michel Charlier and Victor Hubinon.

Publication history 
The "Pilots Demobilized" story arc was published during the early fifties as three separate comic books. The first two, The Red Sea Traffickers (Les Traficants de la Mer Rouge) and Desert Pirates (Les Pirates du Désert), were published in 1951 and the closing novel, The Oil Gangsters (Les Gangsters du Pétrole), in 1952. They were combined into the "Pilots Demobilized" album when the series was republished during the nineties.

Plot

The Red Sea Traffickers 
Unemployed after the end of World War II, Buck Danny, Jerry Tumbler and Sonny Tuckson accept a job as commercial airline pilots for the Arabian Airways in the Middle-East. Due to company policy, they are forced to reach Port Said on their own. On the way from Cairo to Port Said, they save a young woman from a kidnapping. Out of gratitude, she gives them a lift, and they learn that she is a royal princess; her father is the Sheikh of the Oulaï, an independent tribe in the Arabian Peninsula. She indicates that if they ever need help in the region, they can always contact her.

Once in Port Said, the trio takes an Arabian Airways flight to the company's main base in Arabia; on the way, the plane malfunctions, forcing Danny, Tumbler and Tuckson to take over and crash-land it on the base. Disgusted by the company's incompetence, they immediately tender their resignations, but Samuel Bronstein, the airline's CEO, informs them that they will continue to work for him until the price of the lost plane has been paid.

To make matters worse, the three pilots soon discover that the company is using its planes to smuggle arms to several local Arab tribes. Due to the shortage of pilots, Bronstein decides to keep them employed anyway, but places them in the custody of a muscular Arab guard, Achmet, and divides their schedules to prevent any concerted escape. The situation seems hopeless, but a caravan comes into the base bringing an outsider, an Englishwoman who may not be all she seems...

The Desert Pirates 
While Sonny is flying another mission, Danny and Tumbler are freed by the Englishwoman, who turns out to be an MI5 agent investigating the Arabian Airways. The three of them seek asylum at the palace of Emir Hussein, who controls the region, but he is revealed to be in cahoots with Bronstein; the illegal arms were meant to help him retake oil-rich territories from his rival, Sheikh Chekri El-Maahdi (whom Buck and Tumb recognize as the father of the princess they saved in Port Said).

Despite this, they manage to stage another escape and return to the company headquarters disguised as their captors; there, they get into contact with Sonny as he returns from his mission. After knocking out his copilot, Sonny sets a rendez-vous with them on a base runway, where he picks them up and takes off again in a hail of bullets. Unfortunately, the aircraft is hit and crash-lands a few miles out, with the base personnel in hot pursuit.

In the desert, the four escapees nearly die of thirst while evading their pursuers. However, they are spotted by a British reconnaissance aircraft, which quickly directs help to their position. The Arabian Airways thugs pursuing them are arrested, but when the British arrive at the company headquarters, they find it abandoned and dynamited; the planes and arms have left for another location, and Emir Hussein is also nowhere to be found.

The Oil Gangsters 
A month after the events of the previous novel, Bronstein and Hussein are still at large, and to make matters worse, are now trying to kill the three heroes in retaliation for their escape. Buck suggests to the British authorities that they leave the base and seek protection from Sheikh El-Maahdi, who still has not been warned of the plot against him. Pemberton readily agrees, since he cannot help them anyway, the Oulaï being outside of the Crown's jurisdiction.

Once in the Oulaï capital, the pilots meet with Princess Myriam, who obtains an audience with her father; they offer their assistance to the Sheikh, who gratefully accepts and charges them with restoring an abandoned Allied airfield and its fighters, which would grant the Oulaï a decisive advantage over Hussein's forces. In a matter of days, they become the pilots of what they dub the "Ghost Squadron;" however, unknown to the Sheikh, one of his courtiers, Sid Mohammed il-Feral, is betraying him for Bronstein.

After locating Hussein's army, Buck, Tumb and Sonny begin strafing runs that severely disrupt his advance. However, the situation worsens when Feral convinces El-Maahdi to let him lead his men out of the capital and into combat; his actual purpose is to leave the city undefended, allowing Bronstein's cargo planes to land on a friendly airstrip and unload their troops. Danny, who suspected Feral's duplicity, takes steps to defend the capital; when Bronstein's planes arrive, the "Ghost Squadron" is awaiting them, shooting several of them down and sending the rest running.

Meanwhile, Feral and Hussein's armies meet up in the desert, but the two leaders find themselves in conflict when they discover that Bronstein had promised El-Maahdi's throne to each of them separately. In the battle that follows, both are killed; Hussein's army is routed, while Feral's, left leaderless, simply returns to the city. The end of the threat sparks celebrations in the Oulaï capital, and el-Maahdi personally thanks the three Americans, who decide to return to New York for some well-deserved R&R.

Behind the scenes 
The plot of "Pilots Demobilized" was inspired by the discovery and development of Persian Gulf oil in the aftermath of World War II, and the cutthroat competition that resulted between British and American companies on the one hand, and their surrogates among the local clans and dynasties on the other, sometimes leading to real bloodshed. Charlier and Hubinon were especially inspired by the conflict in Abu Dhabi between the ruling Sheikh Shakbut, who favored British interests, and his brother Zayed, who was supported by the Saudi-American Aramco.

To date, the "Pilots Demobilized" trilogy remains the only one in which Buck, Tumb and Sonny are civilians and not employed by the U.S. military. This provoked a negative reaction from many fans, who had enjoyed the six preceding novels and found the characters much more dull in the world of international trafficking and economic espionage than they had been as war heroes. The authors took this lesson to heart; in the next novel, the trio were re-hired by the U.S. Air Force (and, three novels later, the Navy), and never left their uniform again.

Characters 
 Buck Danny: the lead character, formerly a Major in the Flying Tigers. Before Pearl Harbor, he was employed as an engineer, but he has not kept current with the technological advances made during the war and his skills are no longer marketable.
 Jerry "Tumb" Tumbler: formerly one of the best men in Danny's squadron, he is also unable to find work after the war.
 Sonny Tuckson: another one of the aces in Danny's old squadron. Sonny enlisted at a very young age, and did not have any job skills after the war. Before signing on with the Arabian Airways, he is seen working for an Italian restaurant in New York, where he regales the guests with tales of his exploits and often breaks the dishware while reenacting them.
 Samuel Bronstein: the villain. A ruthless businessman and arms dealer, he represents a powerful oil company, which created the Arabian Airways as a cover for their activities in the area. Bronstein leads the failed attempt to take over the Oulaï capital, where he is shot down by Buck Danny.
 Major Pemberton: the local British commander, who does what he can to help the American pilots. He is a competent soldier, but his ability to act is limited by jurisdictional rules as well as the sheer size of the Arabian desert.
 Muriel Hawthorne (aka Agent XB16): a female agent working for MI5 and investigating the illegal arms trafficking in the Arabian peninsula. Resourceful, fluent in Arabic and a crack shot with a handgun.
 Myriam el-Maahdi: the princess of the Oulaï, who helps and is helped by Danny, Tumbler and Tuckson throughout the story. She was educated in the United States and is equally comfortable in Western and Arab worlds; she goes from wearing a business suit when the three pilots meet her in Port Said, to a niqab and abaya in the royal palace, to ordinary workman's clothes when she helps set up the Ghost Squadron.
 Sheikh Chekri el-Maahdi: the ruler of the independent Oulaï tribe, in the Arabian peninsula. A fair minded man, he is open to Western ways and friendly towards the three Americans, but refuses to allow the use of his oil lands, whether by the British Empire or more unsavory types like Bronstein, for fear of exposing his people to exploitation.
 Emir Hussein: a powerful ruler in the region. He once controlled the Oulaï territory, but was ousted by el-Maahdi, and swore to reconquer his land. To this end, he passes an alliance with Bronstein, promising him full access to the region's oil in exchange for the throne.
 Sid Mohammed il-Feral: a powerful, power-hungry and xenophobic member of el-Maahdi's court. For years he has tried to court Myriam as a means to the throne, since the Sheikh has no male children. When Bronstein offers him a faster and more guaranteed alternative, he doesn't hesitate to take the offer.
 Jake: the chief pilot of the company. An alcoholic with a short temper and very little in the way of brains or scruples, he is representative of the people employed by the Arabian Airways.
 Achmet: a massive Arab guard whom Bronstein orders to make sure the American pilots stay put. Unable to take him on physically, Sonny is forced to find several creative ways to incapacitate or distract him.

Aircraft shown in the novel 
 Douglas DC-3.
 P-51 Mustang.
 Supermarine Spitfire

References 

Buck Danny